Honey Creek Township is one of ten townships in Crawford County, Illinois, USA.  As of the 2010 census, its population was 1,563 and it contained 672 housing units.

Geography

Cities, towns, villages
 Flat Rock (west three-quarters)

Unincorporated towns
 Duncanville
 New Hebron
 Port Jackson
 Villas
(This list is based on USGS data and may include former settlements.)

Cemeteries
The township contains these ten cemeteries: Beckwith, Cecedar, Good Hope, Jones, Nuttle, Port Jackson, Rich, Sears, Swearingen, Tohill, and Updike.

Major highways
  Illinois Route 1

Demographics

School districts
 Lawrence County Community Unit District 20
 Oblong Community Unit School District 4
 Palestine Community Unit School District 3
 Robinson Community Unit School District 2

Political districts
 Illinois' 15th congressional district
 State House District 109
 State Senate District 55

References
 
 United States Census Bureau 2007 TIGER/Line Shapefiles
 United States National Atlas

External links
 City-Data.com
 Illinois State Archives

Townships in Crawford County, Illinois
Townships in Illinois